Radvision was a provider of video conferencing and telepresence technologies over IP and wireless networks based in Tel Aviv, Israel.  It offered development and test suites for voice and video over IP communications. Radvision was acquired by Avaya in June 2012. Spirent Communications acquired Radvision's Technology Business Unit from Avaya in July 2014, to become Spirent Developer Tools Business Unit. In July 2017, Spirent Developer Tools BU was spun off into a private company called Softil Ltd.

History
Radvision was founded by Ami Amir in 1992. In 2005, the company acquired FVC.com and its videoconference product called Click to Meet. In December 2011, it was reported that Radvision would be acquired by Avaya for $200 million. In March 2012 Avaya entered into an agreement to acquire the company for $230 million. Its shares were traded on both the NASDAQ and Tel Aviv Stock Exchanges until June 2012. The company had offices and development centers throughout America, Europe and Asia Pacific.

See also 
 List of VOIP companies
 Telepresence
 Videotelephony

References

External links 
 Softil website

Avaya
Telecommunications companies of Israel
VoIP companies of the United States
Companies formerly listed on the Nasdaq
Teleconferencing
Videotelephony
Telecommunications companies established in 1992
Companies based in Tel Aviv
2012 mergers and acquisitions